The Sony Carl Zeiss Sonnar T* E 24mm F1.8 ZA is a wide-angle APS-C prime lens for the Sony E-mount, announced by Sony in December 2011.

Build quality
The lens features a thin aluminum shell over plastic internals and a detachable petal-type lens hood. The lens showcases a minimalist black exterior with a Zeiss badge on the side of the barrel, nearly identical to Sony's Zeiss-approved 55mm F1.8 full-frame lens.

Given its unusually high 1:4 (0.25x) image reproduction ratio, the 24mm lens can be considered a pseudo-macro lens.

Its autofocus is fast and silent.

Image quality
The lens is exceptionally sharp, on par with Sony's other Zeiss-approved prime lenses. When at its maximum aperture of f/1.8, the lens exhibits creamy smooth bokeh. The lens suffers from mild vignetting and chromatic aberration, which can be seen toward the outer edges of the frame.

See also
List of Sony E-mount lenses
Sony E 20mm F2.8
Sigma 30mm F1.4 DC DN
Zeiss Sonnar

References

Camera lenses introduced in 2011
24
24